The Remixes III: Mix Rice Plantation is the third remix album by Japanese duo Every Little Thing. It was released simultaneously with house remixes compilation Cyber Trance presents ELT Trance on February 27, 2002, by Avex Trance. The album contains remixes of tracks from their single "Forever Yours" to "Jump". As their third remix album, this one diverged considerably much from its predecessors, distancing from dance house remixes similar to their previous remixes and focusing on experimental house music, which includes elements of bossa nova and downtempo music. 

The leading song of the album was the Cubismo Grafico remix for "Jump". This is the only remix of Every Little Thing that has had a music video made for it. This music video was included as a bonus track on DVD The Video Compilation III. also, an alternative version of the remix was included as a b-side on the "Jump" single.

Track listing

Chart positions

References

Every Little Thing (band) albums
2002 remix albums